Helenium laciniatum is a North American perennial plant in the sunflower family. It is found in the states of Sinaloa and Sonora in northwestern Mexico.

Leaves are pinnately lobed or compound. One plant can produce several flower heads, each on its own long, thin flower stalk.

References

External links
Photo of herbarium specimen at Missouri Botanical Garden, collected near Yaqui River in Sonora circa 1875, isotype of Helenium laciniatum

Plants described in 1874
laciniatum
Flora of Sonora
Flora of Sinaloa